as  was a Japanese actor, tarento and voice actor.  He was born in Tokyo and died in 2015 of lung cancer.

Filmography

Acting roles

Films
 Torakku Yarō series (1975-1979)
 The Battle of Port Arthur (1980)
 Edo Porn (1981)

Television
 Naruhodo! The World (host, 1981–1996)

Voice roles

Television
 Space Ace (1965), Yadokari
 Son-goku is Coming: Chapter of Ko-fu Dai-o (1966 special), Sagojo
  (1966), Officer Chibisu, Roba
 Gokū no Daibōken (1967), Sagojo
 Speed Racer (1967), Ken'ichi Mifune / Racer X
 Kaibutsu-kun (1968)
 Hakushon Daimaou (1969), Grandfather "And then"
 Inakappe Taishō (1970), Nyanko-sensei
 Vampiyan Kids (2001), Papa

Films
 Dragon Ball: The Path to Power (1996), Kame Sen'nin

Dubbing
Jack Lemmon
The Apartment (C.C. Baxter)
The Front Page (Hildy Johnson)
Good Neighbor Sam (Sam Bissell)
The Great Race (Professor Fate / Prince Hapnic)
How to Murder Your Wife (Stanley Ford)
Irma la Douce (Nestor Patou / Lord X)
Mister Roberts (Ens. Frank Thurlowe Pulver)
Some Like It Hot (Jerry - 'Daphne')
Under the Yum Yum Tree (Hogan)
The Wackiest Ship In the Army (Lt. Rip Crandall)
Singin' in the Rain (Donald Lockwood (Gene Kelly))
Strangers on a Train (Guy Haines (Farley Granger))

Classic roles
 Tōkyō Megure Keishi, a 25-episode TV Series aired from April 14 to May 29, 1978, on Asahi TV. Although the series is based on a French series of Maigret mystery books by Georges Simenon and Aikawa is now primarily known as a voice actor, it is not a dubbed version of the French TV Series based on the books. Aikawa stars in person as Megure, a Japanese-born equivalent to the French Maigret, reinvented in a Japanese setting.

References

External links

1934 births
2015 deaths
Japanese male video game actors
Japanese male voice actors
Japanese radio personalities
Japanese television personalities
Male voice actors from Tokyo